The Saint Joseph of Manga Chapel is a Roman Catholic chapel near the suburban neighbourhood of Villa García, Montevideo, Uruguay.

Originally it was part of the Jackson Agricultural School (established by Juan D. Jackson) and Salesian Educational School. Built by Ernesto Vespignani, it is dedicated to Saint Joseph. Nowadays it is an important wedding venue, inside the Jacksonville Development. Due to this reason, this church is socially known as Capilla Jacksonville.

References

External links
 Parroquia Cristo de Toledo - Capilla San José de Manga

 
Roman Catholic church buildings in Montevideo
Roman Catholic chapels in Uruguay